Leonid Derevyanko is a Soviet sprint canoer who competed in the early to mid-1970s. He won three medals at the ICF Canoe Sprint World Championships with a gold (K-4 10000 m: 1974) and two bronzes (K-1 4 x 500 m: 1971, K-4 10000 m: 1975).

References

Living people
Soviet male canoeists
Year of birth missing (living people)
Russian male canoeists
ICF Canoe Sprint World Championships medalists in kayak
Honoured Masters of Sport of the USSR